Azan (also Romanized as Āzān) is a village in Hasan Reza Rural District, in the Central District of Juybar County, Mazandaran Province, Iran. At the 2006 census, its population was 70, in 20 families.

References 

Populated places in Juybar County